Gillian Clark may refer to:

Gillian Clark (aid worker) (1956–2003), Canadian aid worker who was killed in the Canal Hotel bombing in Iraq
Gillian Clark (badminton) (born 1961), former English female badminton player
Gillian Clark (historian), a professor on classics and ancient history

See also
Gillian Clarke (born 1937), poet